Lila Morris O'Neale (November 2, 1886 – February 2, 1948) was an American anthropologist and historian of textiles. She was awarded a Guggenheim Fellowship in 1931 for her research on prehistoric textiles in Peru.

Early life and education
Lila Morris O'Neale was born in Buxton, North Dakota, the daughter of George Lester O'Neale (an immigrant from Ireland) and Carrie Higgins O'Neale. She moved with her family to San Jose, California as a girl. She trained as a teacher, like her mother before her; she attended the state teachers college in San Jose, and earned an A. B. at Stanford University (1910); she completed a bachelor's degree from Columbia University in 1916. In 1926, she left a university job to pursue graduate studies in decorative arts at the University of California at Berkeley. She earned a master's degree in 1927 with a thesis on ancient Peruvian fabrics, and in 1930 was granted a Ph.D. in anthropology from Berkeley, at age 44, for a fieldwork study of the basketry methods of California Native American women weavers. Her dissertation project, "Yurok-Karok Basket Weavers", was overseen by anthropologist Alfred L. Kroeber, who remained a supportive colleague.

Career
O'Neale taught school in Oakland, and worked in higher education at San Jose State University and the Stout Institute. She taught Household Art at Oregon State University in Corvallis. In 1922, she taught two courses in the summer session at the University of Southern California.

After a break for graduate studies, she returned to academic employment, as a professor in Household Art (later renamed the Department of Decorative Art in 1939) at Berkeley. She became a full professor in 1941. She taught courses on the history, design, and analysis of textiles and costumes. She also served as Associate Curator of Textiles at the Museum of Anthropology on campus.  She was the first woman to teach an anthropology course at Berkeley, when she covered courses for Edward Winslow Gifford, while he was on leave in 1931.

Monographs by O'Neale include Textile Periods in Ancient Peru (1930), Yurok-Karok Basket Weavers (1932), Papago Color Designations (1943, with Juan Dolores), and Textiles of Highland Guatemala (1945). On both historical and anthropological topics, she was a hands-on scholar, determined to recreate the patterns and textures of the works she studied.

The Paracas textiles had been found in the 1920s in Peru. O'Neale was awarded a Guggenheim Fellowship in 1931 to support travel to Lima, Peru for her work on Inca and pre-Inca textiles in South America.

Personal life
O'Neale was "life-long companion" of Martha Thomas, a fellow scholar of Household Art, who taught in San Jose. They hosted social gatherings together at O'Neale's house, and traveled together. O'Neale died from pneumonia in 1948, aged 61 years, just three days after giving her last examination. Her papers are at the Bancroft Library at Berkeley.

References

External links

1886 births
1948 deaths
20th-century American anthropologists
Textile historians
American women curators
American curators
American women anthropologists
Academics from North Dakota
American women academics